Zatrephes trilineata is a moth of the family Erebidae. It was described by George Hampson in 1905. It is found in French Guiana, Suriname and Peru.

Subspecies
Ennomomima trilineata trilineata (French Guiana)
Ennomomima trilineata peruviana (Rothschild, 1910) (Peru)

References

Phaegopterina
Moths described in 1905
Moths of South America